The Order and Medal of Bravery were honorary awards given to the citizens, families and military units in the People's Socialist Republic of Albania.

Definition
The order and medal were given to citizens, families, units and subdivisions of the military that participated in the National Liberation War and fought with bravery and self-sacrifice against  the enemy, as well as for bravery shown in cases of aggression or provocation on a large scale against the People's Socialist Republic of Albania.

See also
Orders, decorations and medals of Albania

References

Awards established in 1945
Order